The men's 400 metre freestyle event at the 1952 Olympic Games took place between 28 and 30 July at the Swimming Stadium. This swimming event used freestyle swimming, which means that the method of the stroke is not regulated (unlike backstroke, breaststroke, and butterfly events). Nearly all swimmers use the front crawl or a variant of that stroke. Because an Olympic-size swimming pool is 50 metres long, this race consisted of eight lengths of the pool.

Medalists

At the conclusion of the race, Boiteux's father jumped into the pool to congratulate his son.

Results

Heats
Heat 1

Heat 2

Heat 3

Heat 4

Heat 5

Heat 6

Heat 7

Heat 8

Final

Key: OR = Olympic record

References

Men's freestyle 400 metre
Men's events at the 1952 Summer Olympics